David Pakman (born January 29, 1969, in Philadelphia, Pennsylvania) is an internet entrepreneur and venture capitalist. He is managing director at CoinFund, a blockchain-focused investment firm founded in 2015 with the goal of shaping the global transition to digital assets and decentralized finance. He focuses on early stage venture investments in all sectors of crypto. Previously, he was a Partner in Venrock's New York City office focused on early stage venture investing in consumer and enterprise internet companies. His investments include Dstillery, Smartling, Simbe Robotics, Dapper Labs/Flow/CryptoKitties, Rarible and Running Tide Technologies. He led the Series A and B rounds and sat on the board of Dollar Shave Club which was acquired by Unilever for $1 billion. He was a board member at Crunchyroll (acquired by The Chernin Group) and led Venrock's investment in Klout (acquired by Lithium Technologies).

Education and personal life
David Pakman is a graduate of and a former member of the Board of Overseers at University of Pennsylvania's School of Engineering and Applied Science with a BSE (1991) degree in Computer Science Engineering and is an avid musician and songwriter.

In 2020 he was the drummer for When In Rome II on the first half of the SiriusXM Totally 80s Live Tour with The Motels and Bow Wow Wow and has played more dates with the band in 2021.

At Penn, Pakman's senior design project advisor was David J. Farber. He was the co-founder of Penn Engineering's Dining Philosophers, the computer science club that, at the time, was Penn's chapter of the Association for Computing Machinery or the ACM.

Career
In 1991, Pakman joined Apple Inc.'s System Software Product Marketing group and later co-created Apple's Music Group. There he co-founded the Macintosh New York Music Festival and co-produced the then-largest industry webcast to-date, the 1997 GRAMMY Awards.

In 2003, Pakman joined Dimensional Associates, a private equity firm focused on acquiring distressed digital media companies. The firm bought eMusic from Vivendi Universal and Pakman became the COO. In 2005, Pakman became the CEO and grew eMusic to become, at that time, the world's leading digital retailer of independent music, second only to iTunes in number of downloads sold. In the three years that Pakman ran it, he grew the business by more than 850%, from $7M in revenues to more than $68M. Pakman transformed the business from an obscure also-ran with 50,000 subscribers to the second largest digital music retailer in the world, with more than 400,000 subscribers and more than 12% market share (according to the NPD Group). 
 
Prior to joining eMusic, Pakman was co-founder and president of business development and public policy at Myplay, Inc., the company he co-founded in 1999 in Redwood City, California with Doug Camplejohn that introduced the "digital music locker" and pioneered the locker category. In 2001, Myplay was sold to Bertelsmann's ecommerce Group where Pakman became the SVP of Corporate Development and Public Policy. Before Myplay, he was vice president at N2K Entertainment, which created the first digital music download service

Pakman served on the Board of NARM (National Association of Recording Merchandisers). He was formerly a board member of DiMA (Digital Media Association) in Washington, D.C. and co-chair of its Music Licensing Committee. He has testified before Congress and the NTIA about the Digital Millennium Copyright Act (DMCA), guest-lectured at The Wharton School and the School of Engineering and Applied Science at the University of Pennsylvania, Harvard, Columbia and MIT, and has spoken at hundreds of conferences and public events. In May 2007 he delivered the Commencement Address at Penn Engineering's 251st Commencement. He was a member of Penn Engineering's Board of Overseers from 2007 to 2010.

Pakman also served on the Board of Trustees of ITHAKA, a not-for-profit organization dedicated to helping the academic community take full advantage of rapidly advancing information and networking technologies (see JSTOR) and holds a board seat with the New York Venture Capital Association. In September 2012, Pakman joined Jazz at Lincoln Center's Digital Advisory Council. Pakman was a board member of POTS (Part Of The Solution), a "One-Stop-Shop" in the Bronx helping low-income individuals and families move from crisis to stability, and ultimately self-sufficiency. In June 2015, Pakman became a Trustee at St. Luke's School (Connecticut), a secular, college-preparatory day school in New Canaan, Connecticut for grades 5 through 12 and served there until June 2022.

On November 29, 2012, Pakman testified in front of the U. S. House Judiciary Committee Subcommittee on Intellectual Property, Competition and the Internet regarding the state of internet radio licensing.

External links 
 Venrock

References 

1969 births
Living people
American computer businesspeople
Businesspeople from Philadelphia